Mother Earth may refer to:

The Earth goddess in any of the world's mythologies
Mother goddess
Mother Nature, a common personification of the Earth and its biosphere as the giver and sustainer of life

Written media and literature
"Mother Earth" (novella), a science fiction story by Isaac Asimov
Mother Earth (magazine), a magazine founded by anarchist Emma Goldman
Mother Earth (journal), a journal published by anarchists John G. Scott and Jo Ann Wheeler
Mother Earth News, a bi-monthly American magazine
Mother Earth Publishing Association, a publisher closely affiliated with Emma Goldman

Film and television
Mother Earth (film), also known as Terra madre, a 1931 Italian film
The Mother Earth, the 2009 Malayalam film Boomi Malayalam
"Mother Earth" (The Green Green Grass), an episode of the BBC sitcom The Green Green Grass

Music

Performers
Mother Earth (American band), a 1967–1977 blues rock band
Mother Earth (UK band), a 1990s acid jazz group
I Mother Earth, a Canadian alternative rock band

Albums and videos
Mother Earth (Maki Ohguro album) or the title song, 1998
Mother Earth (Within Temptation album) or the title song (see below), 2000
Mother Earth Tour, a DVD by Within Temptation, 2003
Tracy Nelson/Mother Earth or Mother Earth, by the American group Mother Earth, 1972

Songs
"Mother Earth" (Memphis Slim song), 1951
"Mother Earth" (Within Temptation song), 2002
"Mother Earth", by Banks from The Altar, 2016
"Mother Earth", by the Cimarons, 1978
"Mother-Earth", by Crass from Stations of the Crass, 1979
"Mother Earth", by Freedom Call from The Circle of Life, 2005
"Mother Earth", by Ian Thomas, 1975
"Mother Earth", by Jan Berry, 1972
"Mother Earth", by Sweet from Cut Above the Rest, 1979
"Mother Earth", by Tom Rush from Merrimack County, 1972
"Mother Earth", by Underworld from Dubnobasswithmyheadman, 1994
"Mother Earth", by Emitt Rhodes from The American Dream, 1970
"Mother Earth (Natural Anthem)", by Neil Young from Ragged Glory, 1990
"Mother Earth – a Fanfare", a composition by David Maslanka, 2003

Other
 Mother Earth (horse) (foaled 2018), an Irish Thoroughbred racehorse
 Mother Earth Brewing, a brewery in Kinston, North Carolina, US
 Mother Earth Brewing Company, a brewery in Vista, California, US

See also
Atabey (goddess)
Earth (disambiguation)
Environmentalism
Gaia hypothesis 
Gaia philosophy
Ötüken